Knox Peak is a small but distinctive rock peak, or nunatak, located between Vann Peak and Lackey Ridge at the west end of the Ohio Range, Antarctica. It was surveyed by the United States Antarctic Research Program Horlick Mountains Traverse party in December 1958 and named by the Advisory Committee on Antarctic Names for Antarctic cartographer Arthur S. Knox, who worked for the Branch of Special Maps, U.S. Geological Survey.

References

Nunataks of Marie Byrd Land